The Sing-song Girls of Shanghai, also translated as Shanghai Flowers or Biographies of Flowers by the Seashore, is an 1892 novel by Han Bangqing.

The novel, the first such novel to be serially published, chronicles lives of courtesans in Shanghai in the late 19th century. Unlike most prostitution-oriented novels in Wu Chinese, specifically the Suzhou dialect, all dialog in this novel is in Wu.

The acclaimed writer Eileen Chang translated the book into Mandarin, published in two parts under the titles "" and "" (lit. The Flowers of the Sea Bloom / Fade" or "The Flowers of Shanghai Bloom / Fade"). She also translated the book into English, which was not discovered until after her death. Eva Hung revised and edited the English translation before its publication.

Wilt L. Idema, who wrote a book review of The Chinese Novel at the Turn of the Century in T'oung Pao, wrote that the novel Shanghai Flowers included the use of Wu in dialogs, a "doomed to failure" protagonist, and a consciously crafted plot, therefore the book "already showed many of the characteristics of a typical Late Ch'ing novel".

A film adaptation called Flowers of Shanghai was made in 1998.

Reception
Hu Shih, Lu Xun, and other Chinese literary figures critically acclaimed Shanghai Flowers. However, the novel did not sell very well. Lesley Downer of The New York Times wrote that few people read the novel in China as of 2005.

Hu Shih's thesis is that because the novel had such a strong usage of Wu, readers had difficulty understanding it. Donald B. Snow, author of Cantonese as Written Language: The Growth of a Written Chinese Vernacular, wrote that generally the sales of other novels outperformed Shanghai Flowers because their limited usage of the Wu made them easier to read. David Der-wei Wang argued that the main usage of Wu in the novel was by the courtesans and therefore the original novel would be fairly understood by other Chinese speakers. Wang concluded that the language would not be the reason for the novel's continued unpopularity since Chang had written her Mandarin translation. Instead, Wang argued that Han Bangqing's "matter-of-fact" way of describing things, which opposes opulent descriptions of events and food; and the general lack of sensationalism and "sentimental narcissism" contribute to "the fact that it does not read like the courtesan novel we generally know."

English translation

See also

 Nine-tailed Turtles

References
 Forbes, Andrew. Shanghai (National Geographic Traveler Beijing & Shanghai). National Geographic Books, 2007. , 9781426201486.
 Idema, W. L. "The Chinese Novel at the Turn of the Century" (book review). T'oung Pao, 01/1982, Volume 68, Issue 4/5, pp. 352 – 355 
 Snow, Donald B. Cantonese as Written Language: The Growth of a Written Chinese Vernacular. Hong Kong University Press, 2004. , 9789622097094.
 Wang, David Der-wei. "Foreword." In:

Notes

External links
  海上花列傳 - Wikisource
  海上花列傳

Qing dynasty novels
Shanghainese
Culture in Suzhou
Novels set in Shanghai
1892 novels
19th-century Chinese novels
Columbia University Press books